Viliam Široký (31 May 1902 – 6 October 1971) was a prominent Communist politician of Czechoslovakia, the prime minister from 1953 to 1963. He also served as the leader of the Communist Party of Slovakia between 1945 and 1954.

Biography 
Široký was born in to the family of railroad workers. According to the French historian Muriel Blaive, he was an ethnic Hungarian.

He joined the Communist Party of Czechoslovakia at the age of 19 and quickly rose in the party apparatus after the election of Klement Gottwald as general secretary. Together with Václav Kopecký, Široký were agents of the Soviet NKVD, whose task was to inform the Moscow leadership mainly about Gottwald's activities.  

He was elected as a member of the National Assembly of Czechoslovakia and prior to the start of the Second World War he was elected secretary of the Communist Party of Slovakia. In the autumn of 1938, Široký left for the USSR due to the growing threat of invasion from Nazi Germany. During the war, he first worked as a member of the exiled foreign secretariat of the Communist Party in Paris, later in a similar position in Moscow.   

In 1941 he was sent to Slovakia, where he was soon arrested and sentenced to the Leopoldov Prison. At the beginning of 1945, he managed to escape and cross the approaching front to the Red Army.

After the end of the war, Široký became one of the most influential men in the Czechoslovakia. He was a member of the Politburo of the CPC as well its secretariat. He also held important government positions, From April 4, 1945, he was Deputy Prime Minister of Czechoslovakia and held this post in several post-war governments until March 21, 1953. From March 14, 1950 to January 31, 1953, he was Minister of Foreign Affairs in Antonín Zápotocký's government, and he presided over this government from March 21, 1953, after Zápotocký became president of the republic. Subsequently, he was the Prime Minister of other governments and held the post of Prime Minister until 20 September 1963. 

Široký was an initiator of the campaign against bourgeois nationalists in Czechoslovakia, which led to the suppression of politicians such as Vladímir Clementis, Laco Novomeský and Gustáv Husák. He took an active part in negotiating and enforcing constitutional changes which resulted in the creation of the 1960 Constitution of the Czechoslovak Socialist Republic.  

His career came in to an abrupt end during the Prague Spring and the rehabilitation processes he was relieved of all posts and in 1968 he was expelled from the ranks of the Communist Party of Czechoslovakia.  

Široký was rehabilitated shortly before his death in 1971 during the period of normalization of his former political enemy, Gustáv Husák.

See also
 List of prime ministers of Czechoslovakia

References

External links

Biography at the Ministry of Foreign Affairs of the Czech Republic

1902 births
1971 deaths
Politicians from Bratislava
People from the Kingdom of Hungary
Hungarians in Slovakia
Members of the Central Committee of the Communist Party of Czechoslovakia
Communist Party of Slovakia (1939) politicians
Prime Ministers of Czechoslovakia
Foreign ministers of Czechoslovakia
Government ministers of Czechoslovakia
Members of the Chamber of Deputies of Czechoslovakia (1935–1939)
Members of the Interim National Assembly of Czechoslovakia 
Members of the Constituent National Assembly of Czechoslovakia
Members of the National Assembly of Czechoslovakia (1948–1954)
Members of the National Assembly of Czechoslovakia (1954–1960)
Members of the National Assembly of Czechoslovakia (1960–1964)
Communist Party of Czechoslovakia prime ministers